Wonosobo Regency is a regency in Central Java province in Indonesia. The regency is located in the town of Wonosobo on the Dieng Plateau. Its area is 984.68 km2 and its population was 754,883 at the 2010 census and 879,124 at the 2020 census; the official estimate as at mid 2021 was 886,613.

Etymology
The word "Wonosobo" is derived from Javanese Wanasaba, which in turn came from Sanskrit Vanasabhā. It literally means 'the gathering place in the forest'.

Administrative districts
Wonosobo Regency is divided into the following fifteen districts (kecamatan), tabulated below with their areas and their populations at the 2010 census and the 2020 census, together with the official estimates as at mid 2021. The table also includes the location of the district headquarters, the number of administrative villages in each district (totalling 236 rural desa and 29 urban kelurahan), and its post code.

The 29 kelurahan (urban villages) are split over 13 district, with 13 in Wonosobo (town) District, 3 in Mojotengah District, 2 in Selomerto District, 2 in Kertek District, and 1 each in Wadaslintang, Kepil, Sapuran, Kaliwiro, Leksono, Kalikajar, Watumalang, Garung and Kejajar Districts; in the latter cases the sole kelurahan is usually the district administrative headquarters.

Climate
Wonosobo has an elevation moderated tropical rainforest climate (Af) with moderate rainfall from July to September and heavy to very heavy rainfall in the remaining months. The following climate data is for the town of Wonosobo.

References

External links
 

Regencies of Central Java